Sanctify the Darkness is the second full-length studio album by Greek thrash metal band Suicidal Angels. It is the first time that the band flies over outside the borders of Greece and more specifically to Munich, to record an album, right from the very beginning until the last detail of the master. Also it is the first time the band works with a producer, R.D Liapakis. Recording was done at the Prophecy and Music Factory Studios, while mixing and mastering took place at Maranis studios in Backnang, Germany. The release of the album took place in November 2009, through the major label Nuclear Blast, after the band won over 1200 bands at the RTN awards.

Track listing
All music and arrangements by Nick and Orfeas; all lyrics by Nick Melissourgos and Themis Katsimichas.

Personnel

References 

2009 albums